Jan Anthony Sapp (born June 12, 1954) is a professor in the Department of Biology, York University, Canada. His writings focus especially on evolutionary biology beyond the classical neo-Darwinian framework, and emphasize the fundamental importance of symbiosis and horizontal gene transfer in heredity and evolution.

Career
Sapp was born in Halifax, Nova Scotia. He completed his BSc hons (Biology) at Dalhousie University in 1976 before earning his MSc and Phd at the Institut d’histoire et de sociopolitique des sciences, at l'Université de Montréal in 1984. He subsequently held an appointment at the University of Melbourne for eight years, where he also served as chair of the Department of History and Philosophy of Science. He was Andrew Mellon Fellow at the Rockefeller University, 1991–92. He held the Canada Research Chair (tier 1) in the History of the Biological Sciences at l’Université du Québec à Montréal from 2001 to 2003 before returning to York University where he has been a professor since 1992.

Sapp's  book Evolution by Association (1994) is the first book to document the history of symbiosis in depth. It was described in a review as a "fine piece of scholarship". He subsequently introduced the terms "symbiome" and "symbiomics" to biology in his book Genesis: The Evolution of Biology (2003). He developed this line of historical research beyond classical neoDarwinian biology further in his book on the history of microbial phylogenetics, The New Foundations of Evolution: On the Tree of Life (2009). He is also known for his writing on the coral reef crisis, focusing in detail on the outbreaks of crown of thorns starfish and coral bleaching. Coexistence: The Ecology and Evolution of Tropical Biology (2016) focuses on the history of tropical biology, and on what he calls the "central enigma" in tropical ecology.

In 2021, Sapp published Genes, Germs and Medicine, an exploration of the development of modern biomedical science in the United States through the life of Joshua Lederberg, an influential scientist. Lederberg his collaborators founded the field of bacterial genetics, and age 33, was the second youngest person in history to win the Nobel Prize. He helped to lay the foundations for genetic engineering, made fundamental revisions to immunological and evolutionary theory, and developed medical genetics.

Bibliography

Recent publications

References

External links
 Biography pages at York University: Department of Biology

1954 births
Canada Research Chairs
Canadian science writers
Historians of science
Living people
Symbiogenesis researchers
Academic staff of York University